The First Presbyterian Church is a historic church at 304 S. Center St. in downtown Lonoke, Arkansas.  It is a single story brick building, with a gabled roof and concrete foundation.  The brick is laid in running bond, and the gable ends are clad in shingles, but were originally finished in half-timbered stucco, in the Tudor Revival style.  The church was built in 1919 to a design by architect John Parks Almand, and is the city's best example of ecclesiastical Tudor Revival architecture.

The building was listed on the National Register of Historic Places in 2004.

See also
National Register of Historic Places listings in Lonoke County, Arkansas

References

Churches on the National Register of Historic Places in Arkansas
Tudor Revival architecture in Arkansas
Churches completed in 1919
Buildings and structures in Lonoke, Arkansas
National Register of Historic Places in Lonoke County, Arkansas